Ng Yat Hoi (Chinese: 吳逸凱; born 6 November 1986 in Hong Kong) is a former Hong Kong professional footballer who played as a goalkeeper.

Club career
As a child, Ng started playing football through the McDonald's youth training program. He chose to become a goalkeeper because he wanted to stand out. 

In 2019, he said that he "felt lucky to be able to turn my hobby into a career". After retiring, Ng became a bodybuilder, fitness coach, and later started a drink shop.

Honours
Hong Kong
2009 East Asian Games Football Event: Gold

References

External links

 Ng Yat Hoi at Soccerway

Living people
1986 births
Hong Kong footballers
Association football goalkeepers
Hong Kong First Division League players
Happy Valley AA players
Shatin SA players
TSW Pegasus FC players